Björn Borg was the defending champion, but retired in the final against Ivan Lendl due to a knee injury.

Seeds

  Björn Borg (final, retired because of a knee injury)
  John McEnroe (second round, retired because of a twisted ankle)
  Vitas Gerulaitis (third round)
  Ivan Lendl (champion)
  John Sadri (quarterfinals)
  Heinz Günthardt (third round)
  Raúl Ramírez (first round)
  Brian Teacher (quarterfinals)
  Tim Gullikson (third round)
 N/A
  Andrew Pattison (second round)
  Peter Rennert (third round)
  Butch Walts (third round)
 N/A
  Bruce Manson (first round)

Draw

Finals

Top half

Section 1

Section 2

Bottom half

Section 3

Section 4

References

External links
 Main draw

1980 Grand Prix (tennis)